Nazdik Singaram is a village in Ranga Reddy district in Telangana, India. It falls under Yacharam mandal. The village is undergoing transformation with the active participation of the youth and the guidance of the senior citizens. The basic source of living is the agriculture and dairy. The villagers are into various sectors like electronic media, IT industry, and Pharmaceutical industry.

History

Geography

Religious places

Transport

Politics  
Most of the villagers are followers of only Congress party no other parties

Schools

Agriculture

Images

Shramadhanam August 2013

Independence Day 2013

Panoramic view
https://maps.google.co.in/maps?ll=17.040045,78.607199&spn=0.005006,0.009645&t=h&z=17&lci=com.panoramio.all

References

Villages in Ranga Reddy district